Pedro Arias (died on 3 August 1212) was the seventh grand master of the Order of Santiago. He became the Master succeeding Fernando González de Marañón in 1210. On 16 July 1212, he fought in the Battle of Las Navas de Tolosa in a Christian Coalition including the Kingdom of Castile, Crown of Aragon and Kingdom of Navarre against the Almohad Caliphate. Despite the victory of the Coalition, the Master died of his wounds on 3 August of that year.

References

Sources

12th-century births
1212 deaths
Grand Masters of the Order of Santiago